Carne Humana (Portuguese for "Human Flesh") is the first studio album by Brazilian rock band Zero, following their EP Passos no Escuro. It came out in 1987 by EMI. Even though it was not as commercially successful as Passos no Escuro, the album spawned the hit singles "Quimeras" and "A Luta e o Prazer". Despite not being released as a single, "Abuso de Poder" was also a very memorable track, being that it criticized the Brazilian military government (which had ended only two years prior to the album's release). The album also includes the only song by Zero written in English, "Game Over".

A music video was made for "Quimeras"; it was recorded at the site of the Electric Power Research Center in Rio de Janeiro.

Since the band would eventually break up in 1989, it would be their only studio album for a long time; however, they reunited in 1998 and released a follow-up, Quinto Elemento, in 2007.

Track listing

Personnel
 Guilherme Isnard – vocals
 Eduardo Amarante – guitars
 Malcolm Oakley – drums
 Ricardo "Rick" Villas-Boas – bass
 Alfred "Freddy" Haiat – keyboard
 Paul Mounsey – production
 Jorge Davidson – art direction
 Mayrton Bahia – executive production

References

External links
 Carne Humana at Discogs

1987 debut albums
Portuguese-language albums
EMI Records albums
Zero (Brazilian band) albums